The RAQSCI model is a mnemonic summary of a business model used to define and structure business requirements. With elements ranked in order of importance, RAQSCI stands for:
Regulatory
Assurance of supply
Quality
Service
Cost (or commercial)
Innovation.

The World Bank recommends the model as "an effective way to ensure that [borrowers'] Procurement Objectives are comprehensive". This model is used educationally to ensure that procurement professionals adopt a broad perspective on business needs and do not focus exclusively on costs.

References

Procurement
Business terms